Giandomenico Majone (born March 27, 1932, died July 31, 2022) is an Italian scholar of political science whose expertise is regulatory governance within the European Union (EU) as well as theories of delegation and their effect on the perceived democratic deficit of the EU. He is an Emeritus Professor of Public Policy at the European University Institute in Florence, Italy.

Education
Majone studied at the University of Padua in the early 1950s acquiring a Master of Arts in political economy in 1956, before enrolling at the Carnegie Institute of Technology, where he received a Master of Science degree in mathematics in 1960. In the early 1960s he studied at the University of California, where he earned a doctorate in statistics in 1965. In 1986 he was appointed professor of public policy analysis at the European University Institute (EUI), a post he held until 1995. Following this, he held a position as an external professor at the EUI in addition to that of visiting distinguished professor at the EU Center and Graduate School of Public and International Affairs at the University of Pittsburgh.

Scholarship
Majone has written on a wide variety of subjects, but his most notable contribution concerns the EU's delegation of regulatory powers. In brief, Majone conceives of the delegation of regulatory powers to supranational institutions such as the European Commission as a means for member states to credibly commit to integration and implementing EU policies. Majone asserts that the scope of EU powers are primarily regulatory and contrasts delegation to the commission with national forms of delegation such as that to an independent central bank.

According to Majone, member states delegate certain regulatory powers to the Commission in order to insulate themselves from democratic pressures that would inhibit optimal policy outcomes, such as "shifting political property rights", whereby the commitments made by one government can be undone by a newly elected one, and "time inconsistency", where the optimal short-term policy may run counter to the optimal long-term policy. These problems indicate that decisions about purely regulatory matters should be made by institutions that are not democratically accountable. For example, although a policy of maintaining low inflation may be the best long-term policy, governments facing elections are motivated to lower interest rates and manufacture short-term economic "booms".

In the context of the EU, Majone interprets this as a defence of the perceived undemocratic nature of institutions like the European Commission and a warning against the introducing democratic reforms like a directly elected Commission President as it could undermine the functions of the supranational institutions.

The Giandomenico Majone Prize
The Giandomenico Majone Prize is in honour of Giandomenico Majone for his outstanding contribution for the study of regulatory governance in the EU or beyond. This award recognises outstanding research by scholars in early stages of her or his career in the field of regulatory governance from all relevant disciplinary backgrounds. The Prize is limited to scholars having completed their PhD no more than seven years before the deadline for submission. The prize is awarded by the European Consortium for Political Research's Standing Group on Regulatory Governance.

Select bibliography

The European Community as a Regulatory State, published by Nijhoff in the Series of Lectures of the Academy of European Law, 1995.

 
 (with Franz-Xaver Kaufmann and Vincent Ostrom, eds.)
 (with Edward S. Quade, ed.)

See also 
 Regulation (European Union)

References 

1932 births
Living people
University of Padua alumni
Carnegie Mellon University alumni
University of California alumni
Italian political scientists
European Union and European integration scholars
Academic staff of the European University Institute